The 1989 World Figure Skating Championships was held at the Palais Omnisports de Paris-Bercy in Paris, France from March 14 to 19. Medals were awarded in men's singles, ladies' singles, pair skating, and ice dancing.

Medal tables

Medalists

Medals by country

Results

Men
Kurt Browning became the first man to win a world championship while completing a quadruple jump.

Ladies
Midori Ito was the first Japanese skater to win gold and the first woman to do a triple axel in a major ISU competition.

Pairs

Ice dancing

References

External links
 results

World Figure Skating Championships
World Figure Skating Championships
F
F
International figure skating competitions hosted by France
March 1989 sports events in Europe
International sports competitions hosted by Paris
1989 in Paris